Novonadezhdino is a rural locality (a selo) and the administrative centre of Novonadezhdinsky Selsoviet, Blagoveshchensky District, Bashkortostan, Russia. The population was 770 as of 2010. There are 5 streets.

Geography 
Novonadezhdino is located 23 km northeast of Blagoveshchensk (the district's administrative centre) by road. Mikhaylovka is the nearest rural locality.

References 

Rural localities in Blagoveshchensky District